The discography of American hard rock band Halestorm consists of five studio albums, one live album, ten extended plays, twenty-one singles, ten promotional singles and twenty-one music videos. The band has placed eleven singles within the top ten of the Mainstream Rock airplay chart, including six number ones. Halestorm had tied the record set by The Pretty Reckless for the most number one singles by a female rock artist or female-fronted rock band (four) with 2018's "Uncomfortable", but the latter band has since extended their own record to seven.

Albums

Studio albums

Live albums

Extended plays

Singles

Promotional singles

Music videos

Notes

References

External links
 
 
 

Discographies of American artists
Heavy metal group discographies